SHME or shme may refer to:
 Shanghai Metal Exchange
 Synthetic human-made environment
 shme, a metasyntactic variable